Trifunović is a Serbian surname, derived from the given name "Trifun" (from Greek Tryphon), which may refer to:

Aleksandar Trifunović (basketball) (born 1967), basketballer
Aleksandar Trifunović (footballer) (born 1954), footballer played for Partizan Belgrade et al., and for Yugoslavia
Branislav Trifunović (born 1978), actor and film producer
Duško Trifunović (1933–2006), poet and writer
Ilija Trifunović-Birčanin (1877–1943), World War II Chetnik commander
Miloš Trifunović (footballer) (born 1984), footballer
Miloš Trifunović (politician) (1871–1957), politician 
Petar Trifunović (1910–1980), chess grandmaster
Sergej Trifunović (born 1972), actor

Serbian surnames
Slavic-language surnames
Patronymic surnames
Surnames from given names